Mr. Fix It is a 2006 American romantic comedy film starring David Boreanaz.  It was directed by Darin Ferriola,
The former working titles were Deception and Boyfriend Girlfriend Relationship, while the former main title was The Perfect Lie.

Synopsis
Lance Valenteen (Boreanaz) makes a living as "Mr Fix It", a guy who is hired by men to get them back together with their ex-girlfriends.  Lance dates the guy's ex-girlfriend and becomes the worst date ever, sending her back to her ex-boyfriend's arms.  When Lance is hired by Bill Smith (Pat Healy) to get Sophia Fiori (Alana de la Garza) back, Lance ends up falling for her.

Cast
 David Boreanaz - Lance Valenteen (Mr Fix It)
 Alana de la Garza - Sophia Fiori
 Scoot McNairy - Dan
 Pat Healy - Bill Smith
 Paul Sorvino - Wally
 Terrence Evans - Charlie
 Lee Weaver - Ralph
 Rodney Rowland - Tip
 Miranda Kwok - Melanie
 Herschel Bleefeld - Shiffy
 Patrica Place - Mrs. Cliverhorn
 Gemini Barnett - Walter
 Dallas McKinney - Bobby
 Amy Allen - Dancer
 Kirsten Berman - Woman #1
 Vanessa Born - Pretty Latina
 Dylan Rummel - Young Lance
 Linwood Sasser - Karaoke D.J.
 Uggie - The Terrier

References

2006 films
American romantic comedy films
2006 romantic comedy films
2000s English-language films
2000s American films